Adventures of a Young Man is a 1939 novel by John Dos Passos, which eventually became the first in this writer's District of Columbia Trilogy.

The novel, which tells of a disillusioned young American radical who fights on the side of the Second Spanish Republic during the Spanish Civil War and is killed during the war, is contemporary with Ernest Hemingway's For Whom the Bell Tolls, with its similar theme. Both books are the outcome of the 1937 visit of Dos Passos and Hemingway to Spain during which their friendship broke up in a sharp quarrel on political as well as personal grounds.

Critic George Packer in The New Yorker deplored the oblivion into which the Dos Passos book had fallen (mainly due to the rightwards political move of its author) and considered it as deserving of enduring fame as Hemingway's novel:
Hemingway’s romantic fable is in almost every way more compelling. But Dos Passos, in his dispirited and unblinking realism, was the one to convey what it meant to be alive in the nineteen-thirties.

References

1939 American novels
Spanish Civil War books
American war novels
Harcourt (publisher) books